Butterweed is a common name for several plants and may refer to:

Conyza, a genus native to eastern Asia and North America
Packera glabella, a species native to central and southeastern North America